The 1950 Connecticut gubernatorial election was held on November 7, 1950. Republican nominee John Davis Lodge defeated Democratic incumbent Chester Bowles with 49.66% of the vote.

This was the first gubernatorial election since the law was changed to have Connecticut's governors elected every four years, instead of every two years, as had been done previously. As a result, Lodge was the first Connecticut Governor to serve a four-year term.

General election

Candidates
Major party candidates
John Davis Lodge, Republican
Chester Bowles, Democratic

Other candidates
Jasper McLevy, Socialist

Results

References

1950
Connecticut
Gubernatorial